Sheikh (Arabic: الشيخ), is an Arabic word meaning elder of a tribe, lord, revered old man, or Islamic scholar. The Shaikh of Sindh are one of the larger communities of the Sindhi Muslims ethnic group. They speak the various dialects of Sindhi, depending on their place of residence. The Shaikh are largely an urban community, residing in the towns and cities of Sindh. Shaikhs have different community in them, namely baghdadi, sanjogi, nangani, deewan and chatani.

Origin 

In South Asia, it is used as an ethnic title generally attributed to Muslim trading families.

Notable people 

 Khan Bahadur Shaikh Sir Ghulam Hussain Hidayatullah KCSI, Pakistani politician from Sindh, first Chief Minister of Sindh (1937–1938), fifth Chief Minister of Sindh (1942–1947), first muslim Governor of Sindh (1947–1948)
 Shaikh Ayaz, Sindhi poet of Pakistan
 Marium Mukhtiar (1992–2015), first lady pilot of Pakistan, died while on duty
 Najmuddin Shaikh, former Foreign Secretary, Pakistan
 Imtiaz Ahmed Shaikh, MPA Shikarpur Pakistan people's party PS 11

References 

 
Sindhi tribes
Social groups of Sindh
Shaikh clans
Surnames
Social groups of Pakistan